The Montenvers Railway or Chemin de fer du Montenvers is a rack railway line in the Haute-Savoie department of France.

Overview
Except for the terminal stations, which are operated in adhesion mode, the line has a gradient varying from 11% to 22%.

The first section of the line as far as Caillet opened in 1908 and the line was completed in 1909.

The trains originally were drawn by steam locomotives built by SLM who supplied six 2-4-2T locomotives between  1908 and 1923. By 1953 the line was electrified, using an overhead line at 11 kV AC and 50 Hz, and service is provided by six electric railcars and trailers and three diesel locomotives, all from SLM.

A cable car connects the station at Montenvers with the glacier which is tunnelled out at that point enabling tourists to walk inside the glacier.

Incidents

On 25 August 1927, the locomotive and the first car of a two-car train derailed on the Montenvers viaduct, killing 15 people and injuring 30 others.

See also 
 Mont Blanc Tramway
 List of highest railways in Europe

References 

Tourist attractions in Haute-Savoie
Mountain railways
Metre gauge railways in France
Rack railways in France
Railway companies of France
Tourism in Auvergne-Rhône-Alpes
Railway lines in Auvergne-Rhône-Alpes